"Goodnight My Love" can refer to:

"Goodnight My Love" (1932 song), by Gus Arnheim, Harry Tobias, and Jules Lemare
"Goodnight My Love" (1936 song), by Mack Gordon and Harry Revel
"Goodnight My Love" (1956 song), by George Motola and John Marascalco
"Goodnight My Love" (1960s song), by Denny Randell and Sandy Linzer